The Mexican Lucha libre, or professional wrestling promotion International Wrestling Revolution Group (IWRG) has produced and scripted a number of wrestling shows since their creation on January 1, 1996 by promoter Adolfo "Pirata" Moreno. Some of these shows have become annual events, some are special one-off events, normally indicated by a special main event match or being promoted under a special name, and some are IWRG's normally scheduled Wednesday or Sunday shows. Many of the annual and special events are headlined by a Lucha de Apuestas, or "bet match", where a wrestler will put his wrestling mask or hair on the line.

The longest-running recurring IWRG show is the Arena Naucalpan Anniversary Show, which started in 1978, making it the second longest-running professional wrestling recurring show series, only surpassed by the Consejo Mundial de Lucha Libre Anniversary Shows that began in 1934. It is the only regular IWRG show that predates the creation of IWRG itself. IWRG's second-longest-running show is their IWRG Anniversary Shows, starting on January 1, 1997, and held within the first couple of days of January. Throughout the year IWRG promotes several other recurring events such as the El Castillo del Terror ("The Tower of Terror"), Legado Final ("Final Legacy") or Guerra del Golfo ("The Gulf War"). They also hold several annual tournament such as El Protector, Rey del Ring ("King of the Ring") and Rebelión de los Juniors amongst others.

History
Wrestler-turned-promoter Adolfo "Pirata" Moreno began promoting wrestling shows in his native Naucalpan de Juárez, Mexico, bringing in wrestlers from Empresa Mexicana de Lucha Libre (EMLL) to Naucalpan as well as featuring wrestlers from the Mexican independent circuit. Later on he would promote shows mainly in "Arena KO Al Gusto" and served as the Universal Wrestling Association (UWA) partner, using the name Promociones Moreno as the business name for his promotional efforts. In 1977 Moreno bought the run down Arena KO Al Gusto and had Arena Naucalpan built in its place, an arena designed specifically for wrestling shows, with a maximum capacity of 2,400 spectators for the shows. Arena Naucalpan became the permanent home for Promociones Moreno, with very few shows held elsewhere. The Arena Naucalpan 1st Anniversary Show was held in December 1978, becoming an annual show for Moreno. The Arena Naucalpan Anniversary Show is the second oldest annual professional wrestling show, only predated by the Consejo Mundial de Lucha Libre Anniversary Shows that started in 1934. In the 1990s the UWA folded and Promociones Moreno worked primarily with EMLL, now rebranded as Consejo Mundial de Lucha Libre (CMLL).

In late 1995 Adolfo Moreno decided to create his own promotion, creating a regular roster instead of relying totally on wrestlers from other promotions, creating the International Wrestling Revolution Group (IWRG; sometimes referred to as Grupo Internacional Revolución in Spanish) on January 1, 1996. From that point on Arena Naucalpan became the main venue for IWRG, hosting the majority of their weekly shows and all of their recurring and named shows as well. The first verified recurring show held by IWRG was the Arena Naucalpan 19th Anniversary show held in December 1996.

Recurring shows
Over the years IWRG has created a number of recurring events, some on an annual basis that IWRG has held year after year since the show was created, other events that they will run on a regular basis although not always at the same time each year, sometimes holding multiple events in one year, other times not holding a specific event in a year. Each year on or close to January 1 IWRG holds their IWRG Anniversary Shows to celebrate their creation on January 1, 1996. Some years the show is promoted specifically under that label, other times they combine the anniversary celebration with another of their annual shows.

The oldest show after the anniversary shows is the IWRG Prisión Fatal ("Deadly Prison") show, with the first being held in 2000, then again in 2009 and then 2012, from then on a regular basis since then. The main event of the Prisión Fatal is a multi-man steel cage match contested under Lucha de Apuestas, or "bet match", rules where the loser would be forced to unmask. the Lucha de Apuestas steel cage match is one of IWRG's signature matches as they promote a number of those matches each year on a regular basis such as IWRG El Castillo del Terror ("Tower of Terror") and IWRG Guerra del Golfo ("Gulf War"). They have also held various one-off steel cage centered shows such as IWRG Guerra del Sexos ("Battle of the Sexes"), an inter-gender match that allows both male and female wrestler to fight each other. Other steel cage match shows have included IWRG La Jaula del Honor ("The Cage of Honor") and IWRG La Jaula de la Muerte ("The Cage of Death").>

IWRG also holds a number of annual tournaments, the oldest still ongoing tournament being the IWRG Rey del Ring ("King of the Ring"), an annual 30-man tournament held almost every year since 2002. In 2011 IWRG began holding an IWRG La Gran Cruzada ("The Great Crusade") tournament, with the winner challenging the Rey del Ring champion at a later date. Since 2010 IWRG has held the IWRG El Protector tournament once a year, a tag team tournament where a rookie and a veteran wrestler are teamed up for a one-night tournament. In the fall IWRG often holds IWRG La Guerra Revolucionaria ("The Revolutionary War"), a one night multi-man torneo cibernetico elimination tournament.

Lucha libre has a very strong family tradition and IWRG honors this with various shows and tournaments throughout the year, including the father/son tournament IWRG Legado Final ("Final Legacy"), as well as their annual IWRG Rebelión de los Juniors ("The Junior Rebellion"), and finally their recurring IWRG Guerra de Familias ("War of the Families") show.

Pre IWRG shows

IWRG shows in the 1990s

IWRG shows in 2000

IWRG shows in 2001

IWRG shows in 2002

IWRG shows in 2003

IWRG shows in 2004

IWRG shows in 2005

IWRG shows in 2006

IWRG shows in 2007

IWRG shows in 2008

IWRG shows in 2009

IWRG shows in 2010

IWRG shows in 2011

IWRG shows in 2012

IWRG shows in 2013

IWRG shows in 2014

IWRG shows in 2015

IWRG shows in 2016

IWRG shows in 2017

IWRG shows in 2018

IWRG shows in 2019

IWRG shows in 2020

References

External links
}